The 2011 USASA National Women's Cup was the 16th edition of the annual national soccer championship, won by the St. Louis powerhouse J.B. Marine S.C. in an overtime 2-1 victory over Sparta United WSC of Salt Lake City.  This was J.B. Marine's sixth title over all competitions.

Regional Phase

Region I

Region II
J.B. Marine S.C. qualified by winning a four-team playoff series after finishing fourth in group play after St. Louis Scott Gallagher, the Croatian Eagles, and the Kansas Dynahawks.

Region III
The Triad United Aces beat the AFC Aces in the final of the Region III playoffs; losing semifinalists were the Central SC Cobras and FC Austin.

Region IV

National Finals

Semi-finals

Final

References

2011
Open
United